The Kuwait Basketball Association is the governing body of basketball in Kuwait.

The association founded in 1957 (joined FIBA in 1959), represents basketball with public authorities as well as with national and international sports organizations and as such with Kuwait in international competitions. It also defends the moral and material interests of Basketball in Kuwait. It is affiliated with FIBA and FIBA Asia.

The association also organizes the Kuwait national basketball team and the Kuwait women's national basketball team.

Leagues
Kuwait Basketball League

References 

FIBA Profile

1957 establishments in Kuwait
Basketball in Kuwait
Basketball governing bodies in Asia
Sports organizations established in 1957